I Only Have Eyes for You is an album by saxophonist Eddie "Lockjaw" Davis recorded in 1962 for the Prestige label.

Reception

The AllMusic review states simply "A five piece with Don Patterson on the Hammond B-3 and Paul Weeden on guitar".

Track listing 
 "I Only Have Eyes for You" (Al Dubin, Harry Warren) - 5:14   
 "Sweet and Lovely" (Gus Arnheim, Jules LeMare, Harry Tobias) - 4:34   
 "Street Lights" (Matthew Gee) - 5:29   
 "The Way You Look Tonight" (Dorothy Fields, Jerome Kern) - 6:31   
 "It's a Pity to Say Goodnight" (Billy Reid) - 4:44   
 "Time on My Hands" (Harold Adamson, Mack Gordon, Vincent Youmans) - 5:48

Personnel 
 Eddie "Lockjaw" Davis - tenor saxophone
 Don Patterson - organ
 Paul Weeden - guitar
 George Duvivier - bass
 Billy James - drums

References 

Eddie "Lockjaw" Davis albums
1962 albums
Albums produced by Ozzie Cadena
Albums recorded at Van Gelder Studio
Prestige Records albums